Encino is a census-designated place (CDP) in Brooks County, Texas, United States. The population was 143 at the 2010 census. It is the site of a United States Border Patrol interior checkpoint.

Geography

Demographics
As of the census of 2000, there were 177 people, 61 households, and 48 families residing in the CDP. The population density was 26.2 people per square mile (10.1/km2). There were 92 housing units at an average density of 13.6/sq mi (5.3/km2). The racial makeup of the CDP was 82.49% White, 0.56% Native American, 15.25% from other races, and 1.69% from two or more races. Hispanic or Latino of any race were 94.92% of the population.

There were 61 households, out of which 44.3% had children under the age of 18 living with them, 59.0% were married couples living together, 13.1% had a female householder with no husband present, and 19.7% were non-families. 14.8% of all households were made up of individuals, and 6.6% had someone living alone who was 65 years of age or older. The average household size was 2.90 and the average family size was 3.22.

In the CDP, the population was spread out, with 31.1% under the age of 18, 10.2% from 18 to 24, 24.9% from 25 to 44, 19.2% from 45 to 64, and 14.7% who were 65 years of age or older. The median age was 36 years. For every 100 females, there were 136.0 males. For every 100 females age 18 and over, there were 117.9 males.

The median income for a household in the CDP was $25,667, and the median income for a family was $25,667. Males had a median income of $38,750 versus $26,250 for females. The per capita income for the CDP was $10,546. About 31.5% of families and 22.4% of the population were below the poverty line, including 17.1% of those under the age of eighteen and 17.9% of those 65 or over.

Education
Encino is served by the Brooks County Independent School District.

See also
 Missing in Brooks County

References

External links
 Handbook of Texas Online

Census-designated places in Brooks County, Texas
Census-designated places in Texas